Monavvar (also Romanized as Monawar; also known as Minavar) is a village in Rudqat Rural District, Sufian District, Shabestar County, East Azerbaijan Province, Iran. At the 2006 census, its population was 377, in 99 families.

References 

Populated places in Shabestar County